The 1982 Chilean telethon was the fifth version of the solidarity campaign conducted in Chile, which took place on the 10th and 11 December 1982. The theme of this edition was "The Last Step, The Most Important", as it was supposed to be the last time the telethon would be produced as it was originally estimated that only 5 editions would be needed, but because of economic needs others would follow, after a 3-year gap. The poster boy was Francisco Muñoz. It was performed at the Teatro Casino Las Vegas in Santiago. The goal was achieved with the sum of $263,402,022.

Sponsors

Transmission 
 Telenorte
 UCV Televisión
 Televisión Nacional de Chile
 Teleonce Universidad de Chile
 Universidad Católica de Chile Televisión

External links 
 Fifth Telethon Closing
 Fifth Telethon Official Theme

Telethon
Chilean telethons